Rosema may refer to:

Rosema (moth) a tropical moth genus
6472 Rosema, a minor planet
Rocky Rosema,  American football player